The Independent Anti-Communist Party of the West (Partido Independiente Anticomunista Occidental; PIACO) was a Guatemalan right-wing party founded in 1953. Led by Inez Nuño, it was the leading anti-Communist party in the Western part of Guatemala. PIACO fought against the government of Jacobo Arbenz Guzmán. After the coup in 1954, it supported the government of Carlos Castillo Armas, and subsequently collaborated with Ydígoras Fuentes.

References
Secret History: The CIA's Classified Account of Its Operations in Guatemala, 1952-1954. (Review) The Journal of Interdisciplinary History. September 22, 2000.
Communism in Guatemala, 1944-1954. by Ronald M. Schneider Published in 1979, Octagon Books (New York).
Political parties of the Americas : Canada, Latin America, and the West Indies / edited by Robert J. Alexander. Westport, Conn. : Greenwood Press, 1982.
Political and agrarian development in Guatemala. by Susan A. Berger Published in 1992, Westview Press (Boulder).
A case history of communist penetration: Guatemala. by United States. Dept. of State. Office of Public Services. Published in 1957, (Washington).
Gleijeses, Piero, Shattered Hope: The Guatemalan Revolution and the United States, 1944-1954, Princeton, 1991.
Encyclopedia of Latin American History and Culture: 2nd ed. 2008.
1953 establishments in Guatemala
Anti-communist parties
Conservative parties in Guatemala
Defunct political parties in Guatemala
Guatemalan Revolution
Political parties established in 1953